Hinton is a village and civil parish near Berkeley in Stroud district, Gloucestershire.  The parish includes the larger villages of Sharpness and Purton.  The ecclesiastical parish is Sharpness with Purton, formerly part of the parish of Berkeley and now united with Slimbridge.

In the 2001 census the civil parish had a population of 1,141, decreasing to 1,083 at the 2011 census.

References

External links

Parish Council website

Villages in Gloucestershire
Stroud District
Civil parishes in Gloucestershire